is a Japanese manga series written and illustrated by Ryo Hanada. It was serialized in Kodansha's seinen manga magazine Monthly Morning Two from September 2019 to October 2021, with its chapters collected in five tankōbon volumes.

Publication
Kodansha collected its chapters in five tankōbon volumes, released from February 21, 2020, to December 23, 2021.

In June 2021, Vertical announced the English release of the manga in North America, starting in 2022.

Volume list

See also
Devils' Line, another manga series by the same author

References

External links
 

Dark fantasy anime and manga
Kodansha manga
Seinen manga
Vertical (publisher) titles